

External links
 Public Art Omaha

Culture of Omaha, Nebraska
Omaha, Nebraska
Public art in Nebraska
Public art